Curio may refer to:

Objects
Bric-à-brac, lesser objets d'art for display
Cabinet of curiosities, a room-sized collection or exhibit of curios or curiosities
Collectables
Curio cabinet, a cabinet constructed for the display of curios

People
 Eberhard Curio (1932–2020), German ecologist
 Gottfried Curio (born 1960), German politician
Curio maximus, a priesthood in ancient Rome that had oversight of the curiae
Gaius Scribonius Curio (disambiguation), the name of several ancient Romans, especially a father and son who were active in the 1st century BC
an online pseudonym for Diana Napolis

Places
Curio, Switzerland, a municipality in the district of Lugano in the canton of Ticino in Switzerland
Curio Bay, a coastal bay best known as the site of a petrified forest some 180 million years old

Popular culture
Curio (Twelfth Night), a character in the Shakespearean comedy Twelfth Night
Curio (band), a Japanese rock band
Curio (The Shak), a character on the television program The Shak

Other uses
Curio (brand), a collection in the Hilton portfolio
Curio (plant), a genus of flowering plant in the family Asteraceae

See also
Curiosity (disambiguation)
Curious (disambiguation)

Curia (disambiguation)
Curie (disambiguation)